Lamia Assi (born December 27, 1955) became minister of tourism of Syria in 2011. She previously served as the Minister of Economy and Trade and as the Ambassador to Malaysia.

Early life and education
Assi was born on 17 December 1955. She earned a bachelor's degree in commerce from the University of Damascus, and a master of business administration from the Higher Institute of Business Administration in 2005.

Career
She served as assistant to the minister of finance for technology from 2002-2004, and was the ambassador to Malaysia from 2004 to 2010. In 2010, she was appointed minister of economy and trade for a brief period, and in 2011, she was appointed minister of tourism.

Personal life
Assi is married and has three children.

See also
Cabinet of Syria

References

1955 births
Living people
Ambassadors of Syria to Malaysia
Syrian ministers of tourism
Arab Socialist Ba'ath Party – Syria Region politicians
Women government ministers of Syria
Syrian women diplomats
Women ambassadors